Jeffrey Patrick Kinney (born February 19, 1971) is an American author and cartoonist, best known as the creator of the children's book series Diary of a Wimpy Kid. He also created the child-oriented website Poptropica.

Early life
Jeff Kinney was born and raised in Fort Washington, Maryland. Kinney attended Potomac Landing Elementary School and later Bishop McNamara High School, where he graduated in 1989. He has an older brother and sister, and a younger brother. He is of Irish descent. He attended the University of Maryland, College Park in the early 1990s. It was in college that Kinney created a popular comic strip, Igdoof, which ran in the school student newspaper, The Diamondback. Kinney graduated from the University of Maryland in 1993, originally majoring in computer science but switching to criminal justice in order to have more time to work on his comic. In 2021 he was inducted into Omicron Delta Kappa as an alumnus of the University of Maryland.

Diary of a Wimpy Kid book series
In January 1998, Kinney brought up the idea of a middle-school weakling named Greg Heffley, who writes illustrated stories about his personal life. In May 2004, FunBrain  and Jeff Kinney released an online version of the story, titled Diary of a Wimpy Kid. The website made daily entries until June 2005. He worked on his book for almost eight years, before showing it to a publisher in New York City, U.S.A

In February 2006, during the New York Comic Con, Jeff signed a multi-book deal with publisher Harry N. Abrams, Inc., to turn Diary of a Wimpy Kid into a print series.

The book became an instant hit, with the online version receiving about 20 million views as of 2007. When many online readers requested a printed version, Kinney agreed, and in April 2007, Diary of a Wimpy Kid was published. To date, 19 Wimpy Kid books have been released, including a movie diary and a Do-It-Yourself Book, and a biography that Greg’s best friend Rowley Jefferson wrote. In April 2009, TIME named Kinney one of The World's Most Influential People. In 2010, 2011, 2012, 2014, 2015, and 2016 the series won a Nickelodeon Kids Choice Award for Favorite Book. The series is still ongoing.

Professional work
 
Kinney works full-time as a writer/illustrator. He also created the kid-friendly website Poptropica which includes two islands called "Wimpy Wonderland" and "Wimpy Boardwalk", where the Diary of a Wimpy Kid characters and events are featured in the Poptropica universe.

Over 250 million copies of the Diary of a Wimpy Kid books have sold globally as of 2020   and the series was developed into feature films for which Kinney served as executive producer.

In May 2015, Kinney and his wife Julie opened "An Unlikely Story," a local bookstore and cafe in Plainville, Massachusetts. Kinney advocates that kids should spend time reading as an alternative to screen time.

Kinney guest-hosted 10 episodes of the 10th season of WGBH local quiz bowl production High School Quiz Show while regular host Billy Costa was away on a special assignment. Kinney hosted the second half of the first-round games, the quarter-finals, and the semi-finals, while Costa hosted the first half of the first-round games and returned to Boston in time for the finals.

Personal life
On December 14, 2003, Jeff Kinney married Julie Kinney. They have two sons together. He currently lives in Plainville, Massachusetts. He is Catholic.

In June 2020 when Manny, a character he created in the Diary of a Wimpy Kid series, became an internet meme relating to the protests arising from the murder of George Floyd, Kinney expressed a distaste for the sensation, stating "I don't like it. The Black Lives Matter movement needs to be taken seriously... I think that assigning a cartoon character to (the movement) trivializes it."

Publications

Diary of a Wimpy Kid 
   Diary of a Wimpy Kid (April 1, 2007)
 Diary of a Wimpy Kid: Rodrick Rules (February 1, 2008)
 Diary of a Wimpy Kid: The Last Straw (January 13, 2009)
 Diary of a Wimpy Kid: Dog Days (October 12, 2009)
 Diary of a Wimpy Kid: The Ugly Truth (November 9, 2010)
 Diary of a Wimpy Kid: Cabin Fever (November 15, 2011)
 Diary of a Wimpy Kid: The Third Wheel (November 13, 2012)
 Diary of a Wimpy Kid: Hard Luck (November 5, 2013)
 Diary of a Wimpy Kid: The Long Haul (November 4, 2014)
 Diary of a Wimpy Kid: Old School (November 3, 2015)
 Diary of a Wimpy Kid: Double Down (November 1, 2016)
 Diary of a Wimpy Kid: The Getaway (November 7, 2017)
 Diary of a Wimpy Kid: The Meltdown (October 30, 2018)
 Diary of a Wimpy Kid: Wrecking Ball (November 5, 2019)
 Diary of a Wimpy Kid: The Deep End (October 27, 2020)
 Diary of a Wimpy Kid: Big Shot (October 26, 2021)
 Diary of a Wimpy Kid: Diper Överlöde (October 25, 2022)

Rowley Jefferson 

 Diary of an Awesome Friendly Kid: Rowley Jefferson's Journal (April 9, 2019)
 Rowley Jefferson's Awesome Friendly Adventure (August 4, 2020)
 Rowley Jefferson's Awesome Friendly Spooky Stories (March 16, 2021)

Supplementary books 
 Diary of a Wimpy Kid Do-It-Yourself-Book (October 1, 2009)
The Wimpy Kid Movie Diary (Original: March 16, 2010, 1st Revised Edition: February 15, 2011, 2nd Revised Edition: June 26, 2012)
 The Wimpy Kid Do-It-Yourself-Book (May 10, 2011)
 The Wimpy Kid Movie Diary: The Next Chapter (May 9, 2017)

Films

The books have been adapted into a film series.

A film based on the first book was released on March 19, 2010. It was produced by 20th Century Fox and directed by Thor Freudenthal. The film starred Zachary Gordon as Greg Heffley, Robert Capron as Rowley Jefferson, Rachael Harris as Susan Heffley, Steve Zahn as Frank Heffley, Devon Bostick as Rodrick Heffley, Connor and Owen Fielding as Manny Heffley, Chloë Grace Moretz as a new character named Angie Steadman, Grayson Russell as Fregley, Laine MacNeil as Patty Farrell, and Karan Brar as Chirag Gupta.

A second film, based on Diary of a Wimpy Kid: Rodrick Rules, was released on March 25, 2011. Zachary Gordon returned as Greg Heffley. Steve Zahn (Frank Heffley) and Rachael Harris (Susan Heffley) also returned. The film was directed by David Bowers and the screenplay was written by Gabe Sachs and Jeff Judah. Some new cast members who appeared in the film included Peyton List as Holly Hills among others. Kinney himself appeared in the film in a cameo role as Holly's father. He would later reprise the role in the third film, Dog Days, which was released in 2012 and combines The Last Straw and Dog Days.

A fourth film, based on The Long Haul, was announced by Kinney via Twitter in April 2016. It was released on May 19, 2017, featuring an entirely new cast. Jeff Kinney also cameos in the film as the owner of a booth at a convention.

References

External links

 
 

American children's writers
 American cartoonists
American criminologists
Living people
Writers from Massachusetts
Writers who illustrated their own writing
People from Plainville, Massachusetts
People from Fort Washington, Maryland
University of Maryland, College Park alumni
1971 births
American Catholics
Catholics from Massachusetts
20th-century Roman Catholics
21st-century Roman Catholics
American people of Irish descent
American writers of Irish descent